Thomm is a municipality in the Trier-Saarburg district, in Rhineland-Palatinate, Germany, near Trier on the river Moselle.

The Fell Exhibition Slate Mine is adjacent to Thomm.

References

External links

 thomm-online.de
 Websites in Thomm

Municipalities in Rhineland-Palatinate
Trier-Saarburg